Košarkarski klub Šenčur, commonly referred to as KK Šenčur or GGD Šenčur due to sponsorship reasons, is a men's professional basketball club based in Šenčur, Slovenia. The club was founded in 1973.

Players

Current roster

Honours
Slovenian Second League
 Winners (1): 2013–14

Slovenian Third League
 Winners (3): 2002–03, 2006–07, 2007–08

References

External links
Official website 
Eurobasket.com Team Profile

Basketball teams established in 1973
Basketball teams in Slovenia
1973 establishments in Yugoslavia
Basketball teams in Yugoslavia